Jarrod Ousley (born October 29, 1977) is an American politician who has served in the Kansas House of Representatives from the 24th district since 2015.

References

1977 births
Living people
Democratic Party members of the Kansas House of Representatives
21st-century American politicians